Splendrillia sarda is a species of sea snail, a marine gastropod mollusk in the family Drilliidae.

Description
The small, brownish-orange to yellowish, claviform shell has a length of 9.2 mm, its diameter 3.7 mm.  The smooth protoconch is small (height about 0.8 mm) and consists of 1½ whorl, the teleoconch contains 5½ whorls.. The axial ribs are strong (with 9-11 ribs on the penultimate whorl). The body whorl has an inverted cone shape and its dorsum is not prominently humped and with a low and distinct varix. The short siphonal canal is relatively wide and twisted slightly to the right. The aperture is narrowly pear-shaped. The outer lip is somewhat flattened in the middle. The base of the columella is strongly curved to the left.

Distribution
This marine species occurs off the upper continental slope of Transkei, South Africa.

References

  Tucker, J.K. 2004 Catalog of recent and fossil turrids (Mollusca: Gastropoda). Zootaxa 682:1–1295.

Endemic fauna of South Africa
sarda
Gastropods described in 1988